Maryna Ivanivna Tkachenko, also spelled Marina, (born 29 August 1965 in Mukachevo, Ukrainian SSR) is a Ukrainian basketball player. She won the gold medal at the 1992 Summer Olympics, with the Unified Team of twelve former Soviet Republics, and a fourth place at the 1996 Summer Olympics with the Ukrainian national team.

References

1965 births
Living people
People from Mukachevo
Ukrainian women's basketball players
Olympic basketball players of the Unified Team
Olympic basketball players of Ukraine
Basketball players at the 1992 Summer Olympics
Basketball players at the 1996 Summer Olympics
Olympic gold medalists for the Unified Team
Olympic medalists in basketball
Soviet women's basketball players
Honoured Masters of Sport of the USSR
Medalists at the 1992 Summer Olympics
Sportspeople from Zakarpattia Oblast